Prémilhat is a commune in the Allier department in Auvergne in central France. It is around 5 km south-west of Montluçon.

Population

International relations
Prémilhat is twinned with the Irish town of Templemore.

See also
Communes of the Allier department

References

Communes of Allier
Allier communes articles needing translation from French Wikipedia